Andrei Alekseyevich Ukhabov (born 22 January 1979) is a former Russian professional football player.

Club career
He played in the Russian Football National League for FC Dynamo Stavropol in 1998.

References

1979 births
People from Novorossiysk
Living people
Russian footballers
Association football midfielders
FC Dynamo Stavropol players
FC Okean Nakhodka players
FC Chernomorets Novorossiysk players
Sportspeople from Krasnodar Krai